The Langham, Melbourne is a five star luxury hotel in Melbourne located on the Southbank Promenade.

Background 
The hotel was built in 1992 as the Sheraton Towers Southgate. It was re-branded as The Langham Hotel, Melbourne on 1 January 2005.

The Hotel Today 
The Langham, Melbourne is part of the Langham Hotels International chain which is owned by the Hong Kong real estate firm Great Eagle Holdings . The five star luxury hotel contains 388 guestrooms and suites most with views of the Melbourne skyline and Yarra river. Facilities inside the hotel range from a gym, spa, pool and the hotels Melba restaurant and two lounges.

References

External links

  Travel+Leisure 2020 Award
  Condé Nast Travellers Awards 2021
 Condé Nast 15 best Melbourne Hotels
  British Airways The Langham Melbourne Information
  Bestmelbournehotels.com Information on The Langham

Hotels in Melbourne
Hotels established in 1992
Hotel buildings completed in 1992